Deadly Dozen is a 2001 World War II oriented squad-based first-person shooter video game developed by nFusion Interactive. The title refers to the famous World War II film The Dirty Dozen. As in the movie, the main protagonists are military misfits sentenced to death or long term imprisonment who are given a chance to redeem themselves by going on dangerous missions. The game was followed by a sequel titled Deadly Dozen: Pacific Theater.

Gameplay
The twelve characters have different specializations: sniper, demolition expert and so on. For every mission, the player selects four of European theater.

Reception

Deadly Dozen received mixed reviews from critics upon release. On Metacritic, the game holds a score of 56/100 based on 7 reviews, indicating "mixed or average reviews". On GameRankings, the game holds a score of 61.33% based on 12 reviews.

Re-release and remaster
In July 2013, Tommo purchased many assets from Atari during their bankruptcy sale, including Deadly Dozen. The company later re-released it on Steam under their "Retroism" brand in 2015. In March 2020, the ownership of the title, alongside other Retroism games, was transferred over to the newly formed Ziggurat Interactive, who currently publish the game.

Ziggurat Interactive published Deadly Dozen Reloaded, a remaster of the original game for PCs and consoles. It was released for the PC via Steam and GOG.com in April 2022. Nintendo Switch, PlayStation 4 and Xbox One versions were released in later half of the year.

References

External links
 nFusion's listing
 

2001 video games
Infogrames games
Nintendo Switch games
PlayStation 4 games
Single-player video games
Tactical shooter video games
Tommo games
Video games developed in the United States
Video games set in Belgium
Video games set in France
Video games set in Germany
Video games set in Libya
Video games set in Norway
Video games set in the Netherlands
Windows games
World War II first-person shooters
Xbox One games
Ziggurat Interactive games